Chiara Varotari (1584–1663) was an Italian Baroque painter.

Biography
Varotari was born in Padua.  According to the Netherlands Institute for Art History (RKD) she was the daughter of Dario Varotari the Elder and the sister of Alessandro Varotari, whom she assisted with his work. Among her students was Caterina Tarabotti. She died in Venice.

References

 Chiara Varotari on Artnet

1584 births
1663 deaths
16th-century Italian painters
17th-century Italian painters
Italian Baroque painters
Painters from Padua
Italian women painters
17th-century Italian women artists
16th-century Italian women artists